Neixiang County is a county under the jurisdiction of Nanyang City, in the southwest of Henan province, China, has an area of  and a population of 610,000 as of 2002.

Neixiang is best known because it has  China's best preserved Yamen, or county government office. The Yamen in Neixiang was built originally in the Yuan Dynasty and has a history of more than 700 years. It was destroyed and rebuilt several times and the existing architecture mostly dates to the Qing Dynasty when it was built by Zhang Bingtao in 1882: it took three years to build. It is currently China's best preserved feudal county government office.

It is home to Neixiang Air Base.

Administrative divisions
As 2012, this county is divided to 10 towns and 6 townships.
Towns

Townships

Climate

Transport

China National Highway 312

References

External links
Official website of Neixiang County Government

 
County-level divisions of Henan
Nanyang, Henan